The Veil Dancer is a 1929 French-German silent film directed by Charles Burguet and starring René Navarre, Hertha von Walther, and Hans Albers.

The film's sets were designed by the art directors Otto Erdmann and Hans Sohnle.

Cast

References

Bibliography

External links

1929 films
Films of the Weimar Republic
Films directed by Charles Burguet
German silent feature films
French silent feature films
German black-and-white films
French black-and-white films